Mikaya Behailu (Amharic: ሚካያ በሃይሉ; 30 May 1977 – 24 December 2013) was an Ethiopian singer who gained prominence for her 2007 album Shemametew. She was nominee of the 2009 Kora Music Award in Nigeria.

On 24 December 2013, Mikaya died at Black Lion Hospital from complication of systematic lupus. In 2018, her second album Gize Binegudim posthumously released by Minew Shewa Records.

Life and career
Mikaya Behailu was born on 30 May 1977 in Addis Ababa. She attended primary and secondary education in Bethlehem and Abyot Kirs school respectively. She received a bachelor's degree in literature from the Addis Ababa University in 2004. Before joining the music industry, Mikaya was a language teacher at School of Tomorrow and Addis International Schools. She has also worked at Muger Cement Factory Addis Ababa branch as a clerk. She released the first album Shemametew in April 2007. In 2009, Mikaya was nominated for the 2009 African Kora Music Award in Nigeria. She had been working for her second album to receive a Master of Arts degree in documentation linguistic and culture from the Addis Ababa University.

Death
In September 2013, Mikaya was diagnosed with systemic lupus, a chronic autoimmune disease. On 24 December 2013, Mikaya, on the way of Black Lion Hospital in Addis Ababa, died on arrival at few hours before midnight. She was working with launch of a talk show that focused on women. The final album, Gize Binegudim, has 12 tracks written by herself. It was posthumously released in January 2018 and available on iTunes and CD Baby. The original CD was brought from distributors.

Discography

References

1977 births
2013 deaths
People from Addis Ababa
21st-century Ethiopian women singers